Miletina is a village in Bosnia and Herzegovina. According to the 1991 census, the village is located in the municipality of Ljubuški. This village has a small river called Lukoc.

Demographics 
According to the 2013 census, its population was 376.

References

Populated places in Ljubuški